Rhabdophis chrysargoides, commonly known as the Javanese keelback or Günther's keelback, is a keelback snake in the family Colubridae found in Java, Indonesia.

References

Rhabdophis
Snakes of Southeast Asia
Reptiles of Indonesia
Endemic fauna of Indonesia
Reptiles described in 1858
Taxa named by Albert Günther